Lambdina is a genus of moths in the family Geometridae first described by Hahn William Capps in 1943.

Species
Listed alphabetically:
Lambdina canitiaria Rupert, 1944
Lambdina fervidaria (Hübner, 1827) - curve-lined looper
Lambdina fervidaria athasaria (Walker, 1860) - spring hemlock looper
Lambdina fiscellaria (Guenée, 1857) - mournful thorn or hemlock looper
Lambdina flavilinearia (Barnes & McDunnough, 1913)
Lambdina laeta (Hulst, 1900)
Lambdina pellucidaria (Grote & Robinson, 1867) - pitch pine looper, eastern pine looper or yellow-headed looper
Lambdina phantoma (Barnes & McDunnough, 1916)
Lambdina pultaria (Guenée, 1857)
Lambdina vitraria (Grote, 1883)

References

Ourapterygini